"To Me" is a song written by Mike Reid and Mack David, and recorded by American country music artists Lee Greenwood and Barbara Mandrell. It was released in July 1984 as the first single from the album Meant for Each Other. The song reached number 3 on the Billboard Hot Country Singles & Tracks chart.

Charts

Weekly charts

Year-end charts

References

1984 singles
Lee Greenwood songs
Barbara Mandrell songs
songs with lyrics by Mack David
Songs written by Mike Reid (singer)
Song recordings produced by Tom Collins (record producer)
MCA Records singles
1984 songs